Typhanie Degois (born 6 January 1993) is a French politician who represented the 1st constituency of the Savoie department in the National Assembly from 2017 until 2022. She is a member of La République En Marche! (LREM).

Early life and education
Degois was born in Northern France and moved to Savoie at the age of 7. She graduated from Pantheon-Assas University with a master's degree in international business law.

Degois is a member of the Fondation Brigitte Bardot, an animal rights group.

Political career
Degois joined the centre-right Union of Democrats and Independents in 2013 but left after a year. 

Degois joined En Marche! the day after it was founded and established a chapter of the movement in Aix-les-Bains. In the 2017 legislative election she was elected to Parliament with 50.76% of the vote in Savoie's 1st constituency, narrowly defeating Dominique Dord of The Republicans who had held the seat for the previous 20 years. At age 24, she was the youngest member of the National Assembly of La République En Marche! as well as the second youngest overall after Ludovic Pajot of the National Front.

In Parliament, Degois served as member of the Committee on Economic Affairs and the Committee on European Affairs. In addition to her committee assignments, she was a member of the French parliamentary friendship groups with Monaco, the Central African Republic and Azerbaijan.

As a parliamentarian, she grew increasingly critical of the La République En Marche group in the National Assembly, voting against key bills supported by a majority of her fellow party members. In May 2022, she announced she would not seek reelection in the upcoming legislative election.

Political positions
In July 2019, Degois voted in favour of the French ratification of the European Union's Comprehensive Economic and Trade Agreement (CETA) with Canada.

See also
 2017 French legislative election

References

1993 births
Living people
French jurists
Deputies of the 15th National Assembly of the French Fifth Republic
Union of Democrats and Independents politicians
La République En Marche! politicians
21st-century French women politicians
Paris 2 Panthéon-Assas University alumni
People from Nord (French department)
Politicians from Auvergne-Rhône-Alpes
Women members of the National Assembly (France)
Members of Parliament for Savoie